A grandad is a male grandparent.

Grandad or Granddad may also refer to:

"Grandad" (song), a UK #1 song by Clive Dunn
Grandad, a UK TV series (1979–1984) starring Clive Dunn as Charlie 'Grandad' Quick
Grandad (Only Fools and Horses), a character in the British sitcom series
Granddad, an Australian lungfish at the Shedd Aquarium in Chicago
Granddad (film), a 1913 American short film directed by Thomas H. Ince
Old Grand-Dad, a bourbon whiskey
7 Grand Dad, a bootleg of The Flintstones: Rescue of Dino and Hoppy

See also
Grandpa (disambiguation)